The 1920 Alabama Crimson Tide baseball team represented the Alabama Crimson Tide of the University of Alabama in the 1920 NCAA baseball season, winning the SIAA championship. The team featured Ike Boone and Riggs Stephenson and  Ernie Wingard.

Schedule and results

References

Alabama Crimson Tide
Alabama Crimson Tide baseball seasons
Southern Intercollegiate Athletic Association baseball champion seasons
1920 in sports in Alabama